Kimmy Tong Fei (born 8 March 1990) is a Chinese actress best known in film for portraying A Cai in From Vegas to Macau film series.

Early life and education
Tong was born in Weifang, Shandong on March 8, 1990. She graduated from Beijing Union University.

Career
Tong was picked by a star agent in 2010 when she was a sophomore at university, and signed with the agency Mega-Vision Pictures Limited.

Her first major film credit was Treasure Hunt (2011), a comedy film directed by Wong Jing and stars Cecilia Cheung and Ronald Cheng. That same year, Tong had a minor role as Dong Dong in Hong Kong Ghost Stories, a horror film starring Jennifer Tse, Chrissie Chau, Stephy Tang, and Pakho Chau.

In February 2012, Tong was cast in the martial arts comedy film Princess and the Seven Kung Fu Masters, playing the daughter of Sammo Hung's character. In October, she co-starred with Hsu Chi and Huang Yali in the micro film Beautiful University. In December, she appeared as young A Bao, a beautiful girl who loves Huang Xiaoming's character, in the drama film The Last Tycoon.

In October 2013, Tong starred opposite Liza Wang, Angie Chiu, Hawick Lau, Tiffany Tang, Monica Mok, Wayne Lai, Selena Li, Kenny Wong, and Edwin Siu in Master of Destiny. She also sang the ending song Haven't changed in the drama.

In January 2014, Kimmy Tong had key supporting role in the comedy film From Vegas to Macau, alongside Chow Yun-fat, Nicholas Tse, Chapman To and Jing Tian. In March that year, she co-starred with Chapman To and Wong Cho-lam in Wilson Chin's fantasy comedy film Black Comedy.

In February 2015, Kimmy Tong reprised her role as A Cai in the From Vegas to Macau sequel, From Vegas to Macau II. In March, she played Li Li, the lover of Jiang Chao's character in the romance comedy film For Love to Let Go. In the following month, she played the female lead role in the comedy film The Rise of a Tomboy, alongside Zanilia Zhao, Hans Zhang and Jung Il-woo. In August of that year, she said she would reprise her role in From Vegas to Macau III. In December, she joined the main cast of Kungfu Boys as An Ran, a school teacher.

In May 2016, Tong portrayed an overseas student Lin Peixin in the French-Chinese romance thriller Lumiere Amoureuse. In June, she starred in a youth film called Our Graduation with Gao Taiyu, Ma Ding, and Xie Yingfei. In December, she co-starred with Hu Xia in the comedy film Youran Jian Nanshan.

Filmography

Film

TV series

Micro film

MV

Music

Photo album

References

External links
 
 

1990 births
People from Weifang
Living people
Actresses from Shandong
Beijing Union University alumni
21st-century Chinese actresses
Chinese film actresses
Chinese television actresses